Hans Christer Sjögren (born 6 April 1950) is a Swedish singer, songwriter and musician. He is best known as the lead vocalist of the dansband Vikingarna.

Early life 

Hans Christer Sjögren was born in Hagfors, Sweden, on 6 April 1950, as the child of Eivor (née Östling) and Hans Sjögren.

Career

1978–2004: Vikingarna 

On 15 September 1978, Stefan Borsch left the band and Sjögren reluctantly became their lead singer.

The first album by Vikingarna with Christer Sjögren as singer is "Kramgoa låtar 7", released in 1979.

2008–present 

He competed in Melodifestivalen 2008, the Swedish preselection for the Eurovision Song Contest.  Taking one of the two top spots in the first semi-final, his song "I Love Europe" was qualified for the final in the Globe Arena on 15 March 2008. He finished in 9th place. In 2018, he appears on Så mycket bättre which is broadcast on TV4.

Personal life 

Sjögren is married to Birgitta Sjögren.

Since the early 2000s, Christer Sjögren lives in Hammarö, outside Karlstad, Sweden.

Legacy

Awards and honours 

 2005: Royal Norwegian Order of Merit

Discography 

Solo
 Andliga sånger (1989)
 Andliga sånger 2 (1993)
 När ljusen ska tändas därhemma (1994) 
 Varför är solen så röd (1996)
 Ett julkort från förr (2000) 
 För kärlekens skull (2003)
 Älskade andliga sånger (2007) 
 40 år med Christer Sjögren (2008) 
 Schlagerminnen (2009)
 En stjärna lyser i natt (2010) 
 Kramgoa låtar 2011 (2011)

Other
 Love Me Tender (2005) 
 King Creole (2006) 
 Mitt sköna sextiotal (2008) 
 Lotta & Christer (2012) 
 Christer Sjögren sjunger Sinatra (2014)

Filmography

Television

Citations

External links 

 
 

1950 births
Living people
People from Hagfors
Dansband singers
Swedish rock singers
Swedish male singers
Melodifestivalen contestants of 2012
Melodifestivalen contestants of 2008